Tasmanophilus opinatus is a species of centipede in the Zelanophilidae family. It is endemic to Australia, and was first described in 1845 by British entomologist George Newport.

Distribution
The species occurs in south-eastern Australia, in Victoria and Tasmania.

Behaviour
The centipedes are solitary terrestrial predators that inhabit plant litter, soil and rotting wood.

References

 

 
opinatus
Centipedes of Australia
Endemic fauna of Australia
Fauna of Tasmania
Fauna of Victoria (Australia)
Animals described in 1845
Taxa named by George Newport